The Ahwaz Ridge is a very narrow outcrop of rocky hills that extend from north-west near the town of Amarah on the Tigris in Iraq, southeast to the town of Ramhormoz, bisecting the Iranian province of Khuzistan in two. The city of Ahwaz is located in the geographical center of the Ridge, where it is cut in two by the mighty Karun. The Ridge is contiguous under the bed of the Karun, creating rapids that prevent seacraft from navigating farther north than Ahwaz, making that river port city the terminus for the sea-land commercial exchanges.

References

Ridges of Asia
Landforms of Iran
Landforms of Khuzestan Province